Longtharai (or, Longtarai) is a hill range in the Indian state of Tripura.

References

Hills of Tripura